Maserati made two naturally-aspirated, straight-6, racing engines, designed for Formula One; between  and . The first engine was the 2.0-liter A6G; in accordance with the engine regulations imposed by the FIA. Several of these engines, or derivatives of these engines, were also used in various Maserati sports cars.

Maserati A6GCM engine
It was developed by Alberto Massimino and Vittorio Bellentani.
 Initially with a  capacity (with a compression ratio of 13.5 :1) delivering , in 1951 and 1952
 Then  capacity (with a compression ratio of 13.5 :1, with twin ignition) delivering , in late 1952
 And finally with a  capacity , with a compression ratio of 12 :1, with twin ignition) delivering , in 1953.
The engine was mated to a 4-speed gearbox.

Maserati 250 F1 engine
The 250F principally used the SSG 220 bhp (@ 7400 rpm) 2.5-litre Maserati A6 straight-six engine.

Maserati 300S sports car engine
The 3.0-liter (approx  at 6200 rpm) engine used in the Maserati 300S was based on the Straight-6 design of the Maserati 250F and incorporated a lengthened stroke developed by Vittorio Bellentani to increase the capacity from the original 2.5-litres. The compression ratio was reduced from 12:1 to 9.5:1, partly due to the FIA regulations requiring the engine to be run on road car fuel. It used three Weber carburetors.

Applications

Formula 1 cars
Maserati A6GCM
Maserati 250F

Sports cars
Maserati 300S

Reference 

Maserati
Formula One engines
Gasoline engines by model
Straight-four engines